The Republican Progressive Democratic Front was a political coalition in the Aosta Valley, formed ahead of the 1946 Italian Constituent Assembly election. Aosta Valley had just been declared an autonomous province by the government of Italy to prevent a risk of annexation by De Gaulle's France, and a special FPTP electoral constituency was created. The Front obtained 21,853 votes (51.79%) of the votes in the Aosta Valley and won the sole seat of the constituency. Giulio Bordon was the FDPR parliamentarian. Bordon sat in the Autonomist group in the Constituent Assembly together with the Action Party.

Composition
It was composed of the following leftist political parties:

Electoral results

References

Defunct political party alliances in Italy
Political parties in Aosta Valley